Holiday Stationstores is a chain of gasoline and convenience stores in the United States. It is part of the second largest (a subsidiary of Alimentation Couche-Tard) convenience store chain in the world, with over 500 locations in 10 states (Alimentation Couche-Tard has 15,000+ locations company-wide including the Holiday Stationstores sites, most under the Circle K brand). Stationstores are located in Alaska, Idaho, Michigan, Minnesota, Montana, North Dakota, South Dakota, Washington, Wisconsin and Wyoming. It is based in Bloomington, Minnesota. Holiday ranked 133rd on Forbes' list of America's largest private companies before its 2017 acquisition. In July 2017, Holiday was acquired by Canadian-based convenience store operator Alimentation Couche-Tard.

History 
In 1928, Arthur and Alfred Erickson, using borrowed money, opened a small general store in Centuria, Wisconsin. Like most small business owners, they wanted to provide "the best goods and finest possible customer service". They were soon able to open additional locations throughout both Wisconsin and Minnesota. With the additional revenue, the brothers got into the petroleum business. In 1939, under the "Holiday" name, they added fueling stations to their general stores. The stores were labeled by their family "Erickson" name, while the fueling side of their business was labeled as "Holiday". Soon, the company began to expand its operations to other states and offering a wide-variety of products.

Holiday Plus, Holiday Foods, and Holiday Express 
In the 1960s, Holiday Companies expanded their business operations by constructing and operating full service discount stores and supermarkets. By the 1980s, with advanced competition from Walmart and Target, Holiday removed general merchandise from their stores and put in full sporting and outdoor goods departments (along with the supermarket). The name of these stores would be Holiday Plus. In the early 1990s, wanting to expand their grocery offerings, Holiday Companies separated their grocery and sporting good stores into two separate brands. The sporting good stores being branded as Holiday Sports, and the supermarkets as Holiday Foods. The Holiday Plus name went away. While Holiday Plus and Holiday Foods were in operation, Holiday's convenience stores were rebranded as Holiday Express. These express stores offered their petroleum and diesel products outside, and general merchandise along with basic groceries inside.

Gander Mountain 
In 1996, after long bankruptcy negotiations with the Federal Bankruptcy Court, Gander Mountain, a large supplier of sporting and outdoor goods, filed a joint plan of reorganization under Chapter 11 Bankruptcy with Holiday Companies. Gander Mountain sold 12 of its 17 stores to Holiday and the existing Holiday Sports stores were rebranded to Gander Mountain. Soon after, Holiday Foods was sold off. After regaining financial and corporate stability, Gander Mountain went private with Holiday Companies being one of its two owners.

Stationstore and Corporate Operations 

Holiday Companies as a whole employs over 7,000 employees. This number consists of employees working in stores, fresh food commissaries, distribution facilities, and offices. Holiday offers a hot, fresh food, high quality fresh ground hot and iced coffee, cappuccino, hot and iced tea, fresh bakery, a breadth of cold fountain beverages (particularly through Couche-Tard's Polar Pop program), frozen carbonated beverages, F'Real milkshakes and smoothies, fresh cookies prepared on site, fresh doughnuts, muffins, packaged bakery, candy, chips and other salty snacks, groceries, fresh meats and cheeses, a massive selection of cooler beverage products, frozen foods, health and beauty products, pet care products, other sundries, tobacco and lottery products, and many other offerings.

Most Stationstores are staffed with a Store Manager (SM or GM), two assistant store managers (ASM), shift leaders, sales associates, and food service specialists (FSS). General managers are responsible for store operations as a whole by tending to store financials and merchandising, hiring (however this duty may often fall into the hands of the ASM), customer satisfaction, food safety, quality assurance, and general maintenance. Assistant store managers are generally responsible to supervising shift leaders and sales associates. ASM's will tend to General Manager duties when the GM is not on site (typically on weekends or on vacation days). All employees help keep the stores cleaned and stocked, and all are responsible for handling customer transactions. FSS's typically work on weekdays, typically before, during, and after Holiday's hot food "Power Hours", but may sometimes be needed to run register. They are responsible for stocking hot foods, cold sandwiches, commissary cases, and any other Holiday-branded food and snacks while working.

Holiday owns two fresh food commissaries. These commissaries produce the "Holiday Pantry" line of fresh breakfast and lunch sandwiches, burritos, hot snacks, hard boiled eggs, and muffins. The commissaries also produce the "Fresh Seasons" line of fresh fruit, vegetables, salads, pastas, cold submarine sandwiches, yogurt, and many more offerings.

Holiday's corporate headquarters is located in Bloomington, Minnesota. It is the company's central operations hub. Within, various departments work together to provide all necessary tools to make day-to-day operations at the store level a success, including the 24/7 help-desk that store employees may call to report issues and get any additional assistance they may need. In May 2020, nine Holiday Stationstores locations were damaged by looting and rioting during the George Floyd protests in Minneapolis–Saint Paul, with two locations being destroyed by arson. The Holiday Stationstores at East 36th Street and Cedar Avenue in Minneapolis was the location of the December 30, 2020, police killing of Dolal Idd during a law enforcement sting operation.

References

External links

Unofficial timeline

1928 establishments in Minnesota
American subsidiaries of foreign companies
Companies based in Bloomington, Minnesota
Economy of the Midwestern United States
Economy of the Northwestern United States
Convenience stores of the United States
Gas stations in the United States
Retail companies established in 1928
Alimentation Couche-Tard
2017 mergers and acquisitions